"Roll Me Through the Rushes" is a song written by David Lasley and Lana Marrano, originally recorded by Rosie, featuring the vocals of David Lasley and released on their "Better Late Than Never" album by RCA in 1976. American R&B singer and songwriter Chaka Khan covered the song for her debut solo album, Chaka, produced by Arif Mardin and released in 1978 by Warner Bros. Records.

The Harlettes opened Act II of Bette Midler's 1976 The Bette Midler Show HBO special with "Roll Me Through the Rushes". In 1977, the live concert was released as Live at Last), Midler's first live album. The song was recorded by Sharon Redd, Ula Hedwig and Charlotte Crossley on their "Formerly of the Harlettes" album released in 1978.

Chaka Khan version

Overview 
Of Chaka Khan's recording on her debut solo album,

Credits and personnel 
Credits are adapted from the album's liner notes.
 Cissy Houston – backing vocals
 Hamish Stuart – backing vocals
 David Lasley – backing vocals, songwriting
 Luther Vandross – backing vocals
 Will Lee – bass
 Rick Marotta – drums
 Leon Pendarvis – electric piano
 Brook Tillotson – French horn
 Jim Buffington – French horn
 Cornell Dupree – guitar
 Phil Upchurch – guitar
 Gene Bianco – harp
 Lana Marrano – songwriting
 Arif Mardin – producer, arranging

Recorded at Atlantic Studios.

Critical reception 
The song received notable critical praise and mention in numerous record reviews and reviews, with Don Shewey of the Boston Phoenix declaring it a "pop-gospel standard". HiFi Magazine wrote "The Arif Mardin-produced album celebrates a lot of Aretha soul" citing "Roll Me Through the Rushes".

References

External links 

 
 

1976 songs
1978 songs
Chaka Khan songs
Songs written by David Lasley
Rhythm and blues ballads
Soul ballads